George McLaren may refer to:

 George McLaren (American football) (1896–1967), American football player and coach
 George McLaren (Australian footballer) (1925–1956), Australian rules footballer
 George McLaren (New Zealand footballer), former New Zealand international football (soccer) player
 George McLaren (born 1997), English actor